This is a list of the main career statistics of professional Romanian tennis player Monica Niculescu.

Performance timelines

Only main-draw results in WTA Tour, Grand Slam tournaments, Fed Cup/Billie Jean King Cup and Olympic Games are included in win–loss records.

Singles
Current through the 2022 French Open.

Doubles
Current after the 2023 Dubai Open.

Mixed doubles

Significant finals

Grand Slam tournament finals

Doubles: 1 (1 runner-up)

Premier-Mandatory/Premier-5 finals

Doubles: 3 (3 runner-ups)

WTA career finals

Singles: 8 (3 titles, 5 runner-ups)

Doubles: 31 (10 titles, 21 runner-ups)

WTA Challenger finals

Singles: 1 (1 title)

Doubles: 2 (1 title, 1 runner-up)

ITF Circuit finals

Singles: 24 (19 titles, 5 runner–ups)

Doubles: 38 (22 titles, 16 runner–ups)

WTA Tour career earnings
Current after the 2022 US Open

Record against other players

Record against top 10 players 
 Niculescu's win–loss record against certain players who have been ranked world No. 10 or higher is as follows. Active players are in boldface:

Top-10 wins

Notes

References 

Niculescu, Monica